A Bachelor of Mathematics (abbreviated B.Math or BMath) is an undergraduate academic degree awarded for successfully completing a program of study in mathematics or related disciplines, such as applied mathematics, actuarial science, computational science, data analytics, financial mathematics, mathematical physics,    pure mathematics, operations research or statistics. The Bachelor of Mathematics caters to high-achieving students seeking to develop a comprehensive specialised knowledge in a field of mathematics or a high level of sophistication in the applications of mathematics.

In practice, this is essentially equivalent to a Bachelor of Science or Bachelor of Arts degree with a speciality in mathematics.  Relatively few institutions award Bachelor of Mathematics degrees, and the distinction between those that do and those that award B.Sc or B.A. degrees for mathematics is usually bureaucratic, rather than curriculum related.

List of institutions awarding Bachelor of Mathematics degrees
Australia
 Flinders University, Adelaide, South Australia
 Queensland University of Technology, Brisbane, Queensland
 The Australian National University, Canberra, Australian Capital Territory  (a Bachelor of Mathematical Sciences BMASC)
 University of Adelaide, Adelaide, South Australia  (a Bachelor of Mathematical Sciences BMathSc or Bachelor of Mathematical and Computer Sciences BMath&CompSc)
 University of Newcastle, Newcastle, New South Wales
University of Western Sydney - Penrith, Parramatta, Cambelltown campuses in NSW.
Macquarie University, North Ryde, NSW.
 University of Queensland, Brisbane, Queensland
 University of South Australia, Adelaide, South Australia  (a Bachelor of Mathematical Sciences BMathSc)
 University of Wollongong, Wollongong, New South Wales

Bangladesh
University of Dhaka, Dhaka, Bangladesh
Jagannath University, Dhaka, Bangladesh
University of Chittagong, Chittagong, Bangladesh
Noakhali University of Science and Technology, Noakhali, Bangladesh

Canada
 Carleton University, Ottawa, Ontario, Canada
 University of Waterloo, Waterloo, Ontario, Canada (BMath or BCS - Computer Science)
 University of Windsor, Windsor, Ontario, Canada

India
 Indian Statistical Institute, Bangalore, India
 Lalit Narayan Mithila University Darbhanga, Bihar, India

Netherlands
 Vrije Universiteit, Amsterdam, Netherlands (degree programme website)

Russia
 Tomsk State University, Tomsk, Russia
 Voronezh State University, Voronezh, Russia
 Novosibirsk State University, Novosibirsk, Russia

United States
 Black Hills State University

Philippines
 Polytechnic University of the Philippines - Taguig Campus
 University of the Philippines Los Baños
 Ateneo de Manila University

Ghana
 Kwame Nkrumah University of Science and Technology
 University of Mines and Technology

South Africa
University of Johannesburg
University of Witwatersrand
University of Cape Town

Duration
A BMath program generally lasts three years with a fourth "honours" year in Australia and University of Waterloo (Canada). The BMath program at Carleton is also four years. BMath programs are increasingly taking about five years to complete because of co-op or internship placements.

References

Mathematics, Bachelor
Mathematics education